Cándido García (2 December 1895 – 22 April 1971) was an Argentine footballer who played as centre-half. García spent his entire career at River Plate, where he played from 1913 to 1927 winning three titles.

García also played six matches for the Argentina national football team from 1915 to 1923. He was also part of Argentina's squad for the 1916 South American Championship.

Nicknamed Cabeza de Oro ("golden head") due to his skills to head the ball, García is regarded for having scored the first official goal in the history of Superclásico v Boca Juniors, on 24 August 1913 at Racing Stadium. River was the winner by 2–1. According to journalists of his time, García's high accuracy to score goals by heading the ball in corner kicks forced rivals to avoid conceding corner kicks.

During his entire career, García played a total of 364 matches, scoring 42 goals.

Titles
River Plate
 Copa de Competencia Jockey Club (1): 1914
 Tie Cup (1): 1914
 Primera División (1): 1920

References

External links
 
 

1895 births
1971 deaths
Argentine footballers
Argentina international footballers
Place of birth missing
Association football midfielders
Club Atlético River Plate footballers